Caitlin Rose Munoz (born 4 October 1983) is an Australian soccer player who played for Canberra Eclipse in the Women's National Soccer League and Canberra United in the W-League. She retired from soccer after the end of the 2019 NPL ACT Women's season, scoring the winning goal for Belconnen United.

She played for the Boston Renegades in 2004. Munoz has represented Australia at the 2002 FIFA World Under 19 Women's Championship and the 2007 FIFA Women's World Cup.

Honours

Club
Canberra United
 W-League Championship: 2011–12, 2014
 W-League Premiership: 2011–12, 2013–14

International
Australia
 OFC U-20 Women's Championship: 2002

References

External links

 
 Matildas player profile
 Canberra United FC player profile

1983 births
Living people
Australian women's soccer players
Canberra United FC players
A-League Women players
Australia women's international soccer players
Women's association football forwards
2007 FIFA Women's World Cup players
Boston Renegades players
USL W-League (1995–2015) players
Australian expatriate sportspeople in the United States
Expatriate women's soccer players in the United States